Artūrs Martins Žagars (born 21 April 2000) is a Latvian professional basketball player for Nevėžis Kėdainiai of the Lithuanian Basketball League (LKL).

Early career 
Žagars spent much of his early career playing for Latvian club BS DSN Riga.

Professional career 
In 2017, Žagars signed a long-term contract with Spanish club Joventut Badalona. On 11 March 2018, Žagars made his Liga ACB debut, scoring two points in seven minutes versus Baskonia.

In November 2018, Žagars suffered a torn ligament in his ankle and was sidelined until early March 2019 after undergoing surgery.

On 19 April 2019, Žagars declared for the 2019 NBA draft.

On 16 February 2021, Žagars was loaned to Estonian powerhouse Kalev/Cramo.

On 12 January 2022, he was loaned to Löwen Braunschweig of the Basketball Bundesliga.

On 20 July 2022, Žagars signed with Nevėžis Kėdainiai of the Lithuanian Basketball League (LKL).

National team career 
Žagars was named to the All-Star Five of the 2018 FIBA Europe Under-18 Championship in Riga after averaging 18.9 points, 6.3 assists, and 1.9 steals per game, while leading the Latvian national under-18 team to its first finals appearance and silver medal at the tournament.

References

External links 

 Artūrs Žagars at acb.com
 Artūrs Žagars at proballers.com
Artūrs Žagars at realgm.com

2000 births
Living people
Basketball Löwen Braunschweig players
Basketball players from Riga
BC Kalev/Cramo players
BC Nevėžis players
CB Prat players
Joventut Badalona players
Latvian expatriate basketball people in Estonia
Latvian expatriate basketball people in Germany
Latvian expatriate basketball people in Lithuania
Latvian expatriate basketball people in Spain
Latvian men's basketball players
Liga ACB players
Point guards